Janine G. Thompson Tremelling (née Thompson; born 12 September 1967) is a former tennis player from Australia who won the Girls' Doubles in the 1985 Wimbledon Championships, with Louise Field.

 she was playing on the seniors tour. As both a singles and doubles player, she featured in the Australian and US Opens, Wimbledon and Roland Garros between 1985 and 1990. She has a career singles win–loss record of 39–58, and a doubles record of 110–78.

Thompson won the 1986 Virginia Slims of Pennsylvania singles title, and won doubles titles in Wellington, Rome and the German Open in 1989, and won competitions in Nashville in 1988.

WTA Tour finals

Singles (1 title)

Doubles (4 titles)

References

External links 
 
 
 
 Janine Thompson at the Australian Open

1967 births
Living people
Australian female tennis players
Tennis players from Sydney
Grand Slam (tennis) champions in girls' doubles
Wimbledon junior champions
Australian Open (tennis) junior champions